Ristori is a surname. Notable people with the surname include:

 Adelaide Ristori (1822–1906), Italian actress
 Dominique Ristori (born 1952), French bureaucrat
 Giovanni Alberto Ristori (1692–1753), Italian opera composer